The Power Distribution Equipment Identification (PDEID)   is a unique identification label used for exclusively identifying equipment and customers of the power distribution network of Iran, which has been in use since 1997. PDEID is used to simplify identifying equipment, their approximate address, updating the electrical network information and to transfer information to computers.

Etymology 
The first unique identification code for equipment was introduced in the Iran's Power Distribution Network Standard in 1969. Only three equipment which were medium and low voltage poles, medium and low voltage branching nodes and distribution substations suggested to have equipment identification label. In 1996, at the 6th Conference on Electrical Power Distribution Networks, an article entitled "Application of the Integrated Equipment Identification Label for Distribution Networks in the Iran" by Gholamreza Saffarpour and Ali Mamdoohi was presented in which a method for uniquely identifying all equipment and subscribers of distribution networks introduced. This method was selected in 1997 with minor modifications by Tavanir to integrate the identification of equipment and subscribers of distribution networks.

Structure of Power Distribution Equipment Identification Label 

Every code in the Power Distribution Equipment Identification label consists of 12 numbers and letters. The labels are grouped into two categories: network equipment and customers.

Distribution Equipment Identification for network equipment 

The equipment label contains 12 numbers and characters. The first 5 identifies the zip code of the area where the equipment is located. The 5-digit postcode contains the location information provided by Iran Post for the whole country. The next two are letters which identify the equipment type-ID. The last five digits are an assigned sequence (or serial) number for the equipment in the postcode area.

The sequence or serial number used in the integrated PDEID is an arbitrary number that is unique within the area of postcode. For example, the first distribution substation in the 13457 postcode should have the serial number 00001 and the second substation in the same postcode area (13457) should have serial number 00002, and so on. In this system, determining which equipment (substation in the above example) is first and which one is second is absolutely arbitrary.

Distribution Equipment Identification for customers (subscribers) 
For customers the Power Distribution Equipment Identification label is composed of 12 digits, and similar to the equipment, the 5 leftmost digits are the 5-digit postcode of the area where the electricity meter of the customer is located. The right 7 digits of the PDEID are the customer-id which is used in the billing system of power distribution utilities. In some parts of the Iran where the customer-id is more than 7 digits, the PDEID has 14 digits, and the 9 rightmost digits contain the customer-id number.

Equipment Type ID 

In the Power Distribution Equipment Identification label, identification is not considered for all equipment. However, by identifying and labeling 23 equipment, all equipment which is important in regard to engineering calculations or information statistics can be uniquely identified. Equipment type-ID does not include the letters I (i), O (o), and Q (q) to avoid confusion with numerals 1 and 0.

In assigning PDEID to the distribution equipment, a single-line diagram is used, so when the three-phase system is used, insulators, cable terminations, and cable joints of all three phases take just one PDEID each.

Changes to the original design 

There are three differences between the final implemented PDEID and what was proposed in the article entitled "Application of the Integrated Equipment Identification Label for Distribution Networks in the Iran” as following:

 Suggested outdoor HV cable termination type id was C1, and indoor HV cable termination type id was C3. In final PDEID type id of both outdoor and indoor HV cable termination is CH.
 Suggested outdoor LV cable termination type id was C2, and indoor LV cable termination type id was C4. In final PDEID type id of both outdoor and indoor HV cable termination is CL.
 Adding the JN type id for virtual node.

Also to improve the readability of the labels, the type id is placed between the postcode (zip code) and sequence number (or customer id number for customers).

References 

Electrical engineering
Electric power distribution network operators